The Charpentier C1 was a French tailless experimental aircraft that was designed by Jean Charpentier during the 1930s. The single prototype crashed on its first flight in January 1934 and further development was cancelled.

Specifications (variant specified)

References

Bibliography

Tailless aircraft
Trimotors
1930s French experimental aircraft
Aircraft first flown in 1934
Tractor aircraft